Jim Gailloreto (born 1960) is an American saxophonist, composer, and group leader from Chicago whose string arrangements were heard on Kurt Elling's Grammy Award–winning CD Dedicated To You.

Biography
Rooted in modern post-bop, Jim Gailloreto has been active on the Chicago jazz and creative music scene since the 1980s. A prolific composer and arranger he has eight recordings as a leader to his credit with three instrumentally diverse groups, and has recorded as a sideman with several notable artists and record labels. Chicagojazz.com describes Gailloreto's compositions as "genre bending".

On his Jazzformation and The Insider recordings, Gailloreto's tenor saxophone is heard with a more conventional small jazz ensemble of guitar, piano, bass, and drums while his Jazz String Quintet recordings feature his soprano sax improvisations backed by a string quintet. Each of these string quintet recordings features standout compositions by Gailloreto along with guest singers Kurt Elling, Patricia Barber, and Cheryl Wilson. Gailloreto's tenor sax also leads the Metropolitan Jazz Octet having taken the reigns from Tom Hilliard, his former professor at DePaul University, 57 years after the group was founded. Hilliard left Gailloreto the group's music library when his health began to fail. The music sat in Gailloreto's basement for years before he resurrected the MJO in 2014. The octet format of the MJO features a small big band, a standard jazz rhythm section of piano, bass, and drums with alto, tenor, and baritone saxophones, trumpet, and trombone. Gailloreto along with saxophonist John Kornegay added charts to the library, which was largely written by Hilliard from the 1950s through the 1980s, and recorded the first new MJO recording The Road to Your Place in 2018.

Chameleon-like as a player, Gailloreto is equally at home performing jazz, blues, fusion, funk, classical, and Latin. He's performed and recorded for singers Patricia Barber and Kurt Elling on Blue Note Records, performed the Chicago premier of Marc Anthony Turnage's Scorched with the Chicago Symphony Orchestra and John Scofield, recorded with New York Latinjazz vibraphonist Mike Freeman, guitarist John McLean, pianists Jeremy Kahn and Fred Simon, and vocalist Grazyna Auguscik. Gailloreto has performed five times at the Chicago Jazz Festival with various ensembles.

Gailloreto graduated DePaul University in 1981 with a bachelor's degree in music composition having studied with George Flynn, and received a master's degree in music composition from Northwestern University in 1983 having studied with Alan Stout. He's a recipient of the New Works: Creation & Presentation Program Grant from Chamber Music America and was recognized in Jazziz Magazine's Woodwinds on Fire jazz select disc.

Gailloreto is an associate professor of music at Roosevelt University's Chicago College of Performing Arts.

Discography

As leader 
 Metropolitan Jazz Octet The Bowie Project featuring Paul Marinaro, 2023, Origin Records
 Metropolitan Jazz Octet It's Too Hot For Words featuring Dee Alexander, 2019, Delmark Records
Metropolitan Jazz Octet The Road to Your Place, 2018 
Jim Gailloreto's Jazz String Quintet Pythiad featuring Cheryl Wilson, 2017 
Jim Gailloreto, Jazzformation, self-produced, 2012 
Jim Gailloreto Jazz String Quintet American Complex featuring Patricia Barber, Origin Classical, 2010 
Jim Gailloreto's Jazz String Quintet featuring Kurt Elling, Naim label, 2006 
Jim Gailloreto, The Insider, Wide Sound, 2003

As featured side musician 
Kurt Elling, The Beautiful Day, OKeh/Sony, 2016
Mike Freeman ZonaVibe, Blue Tjade, VOF, 2015
Mike Freeman ZonaVibe, The Vibesman, VOF, 2012
Alison Ruble, Ashland, Origin, 2010
John McLean, Better Angels, Origin, 2007
Patricia Barber, Mythologies, Blue Note Records, 2006
John Moulder, Trinity, Origin, 2005
Jeremy Kahn, Most of a Nickel, 2005
Grazyna Auguscik, Lulajze, 2005
Kurt Elling, Man in the Air, Blue Note Records, 2003
Fred Simon, Open Book, Columbia, 1991
Kelly Brand, A Dream in a Stone, KOCH Jazz, 1995

Arranger 
Kurt Elling, Dedicated To You, 2009 - *Grammy Award Winner

Compositions 
They Fall, 2014, String Quartet, Soprano Saxophone, Bass & Voice

The Pythiad, 2014, String Quartet, Soprano Saxophone, Bass & Voice

Improvisational Suite (18 min.), 2013
 "No. 2"
 "No. 3"
 "No. 4"

"As of Yet" (6.0 min.), 2013, Cello, Soprano Saxophone & Voice

Sea Songs (40 min.) William Ferris Choral, 2011, String Quartet, Soprano Saxophone & Choir
 "Sea Shells No.1"
 "Languid Fingers"
 "Sea Shells No.2"
 "Wild Nights"
 "Sea Shells No.3"
 "Water's Music"
 "Sea Shells No. 4"
 "Ebb and Flow"

American Complex (25 min.) Origin Classical, 2009
 "Soliloquy"
 "Lullaby"
 "Incantation"
 "Sermon"

Origin Classical
"Bad Clowns" (9 min.), 2009

Naim Label,
"Justina with Strings" (20 min.), 2006
"Shadow Puppets" (3.5 min.), 2006
"Spare Change" (17 min.), 2006
"Universal Soul" (5 min.), 2006
"Admit One" (3 min.), 2006

Arrangements 
Paulinho Garcia (string quartet and rhythm)
Bossa Nova 50 Anniversary, 2010
 "A Ra", Joao Donato
 "Bahia", Ari Barroso
 "Chega de Saudade", Antonio Carlos Jobim
 "Manhe Carnaval", Antonio Carlos Jobim
 "Ronco da Culca", Joao Bosco

Kurt Elling's Grammy Award-winning CD “Dedicated to You”
 "My One And Only Love", Robert Mellin/Guy Wood (6 min.), 2009 string quartet, bass and vocal
 "Nancy With The Laughing Face", Jimmy Van Heusen/Phil Silvers (6 min.), 2009, string quartet, vocalist and rhythm section

Origin Classical
 "Honeysuckle Rose", Fats Waller (4 min.), 2009, cello and soprano saxophone
 "Round Midnight", Thelonious Monk (6 min.), 2009, violin and soprano saxophone
 "Well You Needn't", Thelonious Monk (5 min.), 2009, string quartet & soprano saxophone and guitar
 "Wind Song" (5.5 min.) 2009

Symphony Center
 "Say it (Over And Over Again)", Frank Loesser/Jimmy McHugh (5 min.), 2009, string quartet, vocalist and rhythm section
 "Because of You", Arthur Hammerstein/Dudley Wilkinson (2.5 min.), 2008, cello and soprano saxophone
 "Bye Bye Black Bird", Ray Henderson (6.5 min.), 2008, string quartet, bass, soprano saxophone & vocal
 "My Funny Valentine", Richard Rogers/Lorenz (5 min.), 2008, string quartet, bass, tabla and vocal

Naim Label
 "Infant Eyes", Wayne Shorter (6.5 min.), 2007, string quartet and soprano saxophone
 "Fair Weather", Kenny Dorham (5 min.), 2006, string quartet, bass, soprano saxophone & vocalist
 "Giant Steps", John Coltrane (5 min.), 2006, string quartet and soprano saxophone, Patricia Barber
 "Witch Hunt", Wayne Shorter (9 min.), 2006, string quartet, soprano saxophone and vocalist

Hartstring
 "You Are Too Beautiful", Richard Rogers/Lorenz (3.5 min.), 2006 string quartet vocalist and rhythm section
Chicago Jazz Festival

 "You Don't Know What Love Is", Gene de Paul/Don Raye (7 min.), 2006, string quartet, vocalist and rhythm section

Rob Parton's Ensemble 9
 "Beatrice" (6 min.), 2006
 "Foot Prints" (6 min.), 2006, alto, tenor, br, 2 trumpets, bn & rhythm

Bill Russo's Chicago Jazz Ensemble
 "Street Magic" (7 min.), 2005
Escola de Samba, 2005
 "Corcovado", Antonio - Carlos Jobim, string quartet and rhythm section
Ingrid Graudins and Kurt Elling, 2005
 "Something Good", Oscar Hamerstein, string quartet & vibes

References

External links
 
 

Living people
1960 births
Date of birth missing (living people)
Musicians from Chicago
American jazz tenor saxophonists
American jazz soprano saxophonists
American jazz composers
20th-century American composers
21st-century American composers
DePaul University alumni
Northwestern University alumni
Roosevelt University faculty
American male jazz composers
20th-century American male musicians
21st-century American male musicians
20th-century jazz composers
21st-century jazz composers